Keita Nakagawa (中川 圭太 Keita Nakagawa, born April 12, 1996) is a Japanese professional baseball infielder for the Orix Buffaloes in Japan's Nippon Professional Baseball.

Amateur career
Played at Ozaki Boys since the first year of Elementary School and Izumisano Little Senior while enrolled at Hannan City Ozaki Junior High School. 
After graduating, he went to PL Gakuen High School, and during his first year he regularly played as a first baseman.

During his second year, Keita's teammates were discovered using violence against other students at a training facility on campus, which led the team to a six months suspension.

Under a new coach for his third year, Keita started playing second baseman and became the team's captain. We went on to win the state's championship that year. He finished his high school career with 28 home runs.

After his final year, he submitted a professional appointment report to the Japan Student Baseball Federation, but because he was not taken by any team in the NPB, he enrolled at Toyo University.

References

External links

NPB

1996 births
Living people
Toyo University alumni
Japanese baseball players
Nippon Professional Baseball infielders
Orix Buffaloes players
Baseball people from Osaka
People from Hannan, Osaka